Trenton "Trent" Meacham (born September 26, 1985) is an American professional basketball player for Boulazac Basket Dordogne of the LNB Pro A. He played college basketball at both the University of Dayton and the University of Illinois.

Professional
In July 2009, he signed with WBC Raiffeisen Wels of Austria for the 2009–10 season. In July 2010, he signed with BG Göttingen of Germany for the 2010–11 season.

In June 2011, he signed with Paris-Levallois of France for the 2011–12 season.

In October 2012, he signed with JSF Nanterre of France for the rest of the 2012–13 season. In June 2013, he re-signed with JSF Nanterre for one more year.

In August 2014, he signed a one-year deal with the Italian team Emporio Armani Milano. In February 2015, he left Milano and signed with ASVEL Basket of France. In March 2017, he left ASVEL.

On October 22, 2017, he signed with French club Boulazac Basket Dordogne.

Personal
Meacham is married to Theresa Lisch, a basketball player herself and the sister of his former teammate, Kevin.

References

External links
 Trenton Meacham at eurobasket.com
 Trenton Meacham at euroleague.net
 Trenton Meacham at legabasket.it 
 Trenton Meacham at lnb.fr 

1985 births
Living people
American expatriate basketball people in Austria
American expatriate basketball people in France
American expatriate basketball people in Germany
American expatriate basketball people in Italy
American men's basketball players
ASVEL Basket players
Basketball players from Illinois
BG Göttingen players
Dayton Flyers men's basketball players
Flyers Wels players
Illinois Fighting Illini men's basketball players
Nanterre 92 players
Olimpia Milano players
Metropolitans 92 players
Point guards
Shooting guards
Sportspeople from Champaign, Illinois